The Ministry of Science and Technology (MOST) is a government ministry in Vietnam responsible for state administration of science and technology activities; development of science and technology potentials; intellectual property; standards, metrology and quality control; atomic energy, radiation and nuclear safety.

Ministerial units
    Department of Social and Natural Sciences
    Department of Science and Technology for Economic-Technical Branches
    Department of Technology Appraisal, Examination and Assessment
    Department of High Technology
    Department of Planning and General Affairs
    Department of Finance
    Department of International Cooperations
    Department of Legislation
    Department of Organisation and Personnel
    Ministry Inspectorate
    Ministry Office
    National Office in Southern Region
    State Agency for Technology Innovation
    National Agency for Technology Entrepreneurship and Commercialisation Development
    National Office of Intellectual Property
    Vietnam Atomic Energy Agency
    National Agency for Science and Technology Information
    Vietnam Agency for Radiation and Nuclear Safety
    Directorate for Standards, Metrology and Quality
    Management Board of Hoa Lac High-Tech Park

Administrative units
    National Institute for Science and Technology Policy and Strategy Studies (NISTPASS)
    The Office of National S&T Research Programs
    Information Communication Technology Centre
    Vietnam Science and Technology Magazine
    MOST Management Training Institute
    National Centre for Technological Progress (NACENTECH)
    Vietnam Atomic Energy Commission (VAEC)
    Vietnam Intellectual Property Research Institute (VIPRI)
    Vietnam Centre for Science and Technology Evaluation
    Centre for Vietnam Science and Technology Internationalisation Promotion (VISTIP)
    Institute for Regional Research and Development
    Centre for Science and Technology Communication
    VnExpress newspaper
    Bureau of Accreditation
    Registration Office of Science and Technology Activities
    Science and Technics Publishing House
    Certification Office of Hi-Tech Activities and S&T Enterprises
    National Institute of Patent and Technology Exploitation

References

Science and Technology
Governmental office in Hanoi
Vietnam, Science and Technology
Vietnam